Jamie Moralee (born 2 December 1971) is an English former footballer who played as a midfielder or forward.

Playing career
Moralee started his career at Crystal Palace but found his opportunities limited. He made only six appearances for the club, without scoring. He joined Millwall on a free transfer in September 1992. Moralee scored 20 goals in 76 appearances for Millwall in two seasons as they nearly gained promotion from Division One to the Premier League under Mick McCarthy.

Moralee joined Watford for £450,000 in the summer of 1994. Signed as a replacement for 1993–94 player of the season Paul Furlong, who had left for Chelsea, Moralee proved to be a disappointment, scoring seven times in 69 appearances over two seasons. Watford were relegated to Division Two at the end of the 1995–96 season and Moralee was given a free transfer.

Moralee joined Crewe Alexandra in August 1996, making his debut at Gresty Road in a 1-0 win over Stockport County, but played only 20 times in two seasons without scoring. He spent the 1998–99 season with Brighton & Hove Albion, whom he joined on a free transfer, scoring four times in 35 appearances. After being released once more, he played his final Football League season with Colchester United, for whom he scored twice in 29 appearances.

After leaving Colchester, Moralee signed for full-time League of Wales side Barry Town, managed by former Crystal Palace colleague Peter Nicholas. He played for the side for three years, each time winning the title. His goal in a 2–0 win over T.N.S. secured the title in 2001. As a consequence, Moralee also played in Champions League qualifiers. He left the club in 2003 when they suffered financial breakdown and a player exodus.

Moralee had an unhappy 2003–04 season with Conference side Forest Green Rovers, scoring twice in 12 appearances, before rejoining Nicholas at Newport County in 2004, initially on loan. He had a difficult relationship with the fans of the club, but did score the winning goal in a 2–1 victory against Maidenhead that was vital to the club's Conference South survival After leaving the Welsh club to live closer to his London home, he played the 2005–06 season for Chelmsford City. He also represented a Watford side in Sky's Masters Football.'''

Post-playing career
Moralee is listed on the website of New Era Global Sports Management as the company's managing director. Moralee is also the agent of ex-Queens Park Rangers defender Rio Ferdinand and was widely quoted in the press expressing dismay at Roy Hodgson's decision to omit his client from the UEFA Euro 2012 England squad.

His business interests include co-ownership of the company New Era Overseas, which looks to help footballers with financial investment.

Personal life
He is married to Lisa, with a son, Frankie, born in 2005. He attended Ingram High School close to Selhurst Park, the home of Crystal Palace F.C.

References

External links

1971 births
Living people
Footballers from Wandsworth
English footballers
Crystal Palace F.C. players
Millwall F.C. players
Watford F.C. players
Crewe Alexandra F.C. players
Royal Antwerp F.C. players
Brighton & Hove Albion F.C. players
Colchester United F.C. players
Barry Town United F.C. players
Forest Green Rovers F.C. players
Newport County A.F.C. players
Chelmsford City F.C. players
English Football League players
Belgian Pro League players
Expatriate footballers in Belgium
Association football forwards
Association football agents
British sports agents